Geiparvarin is a coumarin derivative found in the leaves of the Australian Willow (Geijera parviflora). It is a monoamine oxidase inhibitor.

Several analogues of geiparvarin have been studied for antitumor properties.

References 

Monoamine oxidase inhibitors
Coumarins
Phenol ethers
Enones
Alkene derivatives